Tricia Wright (born 1 September 1958 in Epping) is a female former professional English darts player from Mitcham in Surrey.  Her nickname is The Wright Stuff.

Career
Wright competed in the first PDC Women's World Championship final in 2010, losing 6-5 to Stacy Bromberg despite having four darts to win it.  She played at the 2010 Grand Slam of Darts, losing all 3 of her group matches to Raymond van Barneveld, Darryl Fitton and Colin Lloyd.

Since 2001 she has won over 50 amateur titles.

Wright was due to be one of three ladies to play on the 2011 PDC ProTour, along with Bromberg and Anastasia Dobromyslova but after the PDC decided to drop the Women's World championship and thus its qualification to the Grand Slam of Darts she decided to go back to the BDO without playing a single PDC event.

World Championship results

PDC
 2010: Runner-up (lost to Stacy Bromberg 5–6)

BDO
 2018: Last 16: lost to Lorraine Winstanley 0–2)

Career finals

BDO major finals: 1 (1 runner-up)

PDC premier event finals: 1 (1 runner-up)

External links
 Tricia Wright Unicorn Darts
 Profile and stats on Darts Database

English darts players
1958 births
Living people
British Darts Organisation players
Sportspeople from London
Professional Darts Corporation former tour card holders
Professional Darts Corporation women's players